is a Japanese high school, founded in 1937 in Aoyama, Minato-ku, as the ), which moved to Miyamae, Suginami-ku in 1939, and changed its name in 1950 to Nishi High School, with "Nishi" meaning "West". It was well known in the 1950s and 1960s for the large proportion of graduates who gained admission to the prestigious national universities, such as the University of Tokyo, Hitotsubashi University and the Tokyo Institute of Technology, though it suffered a decline later.

As Nishi High School in 2001 was designated as one of the four high schools for the Tokyo Government's emphasis for continued education to college (進学指導重点校), it was once again being referred to as one of the best public high schools in Japan.

The students' active extracurricular activities include: tennis, basketball, handball, American football, brass band and others.

Nishi High School is located within ten minutes' walk from Kugayama Station of Keio Inokashira Line railway, and 20 minutes' walk from Nishi-Ogikubo Station of JR Chūō Main Line railway.

See also 
Education in Tokyo
Hibiya High School
List of Nishi High School's Prominent Teachers & Alumni (東京都立西高等学校の人物一覧)

References

External links 

Official site (in Japanese)
Nishi High School Alumni Association (in Japanese)

Educational institutions established in 1937
High schools in Tokyo
Tokyo Metropolitan Government Board of Education schools
1937 establishments in Japan